Pompeo Targone (1575 – c. 1630), son of a Venetian goldsmith, was an Italian engineer in the service of popes Clement VIII and Paul V. He built the ciborium tabernacle in the Blessed Sacrament chapel of the Archbasilica of St. John Lateran, and one of the altars in the Basilica di Santa Maria Maggiore.

Targone gained notoriety for his inventiveness as a military engineer in the Siege of Ostend (1604) and the Siege of La Rochelle (1627-1628). Targone proposed to block the channel leading to the harbour of La Rochelle in order to stop all supplies to the city, but his structure was broken by the winter weather, before the idea was taken up by the Royal architect Clément Métezeau and the Parisian mason Jean Thiriau. Targone has also been credited with the invention of the field mill in Vittorio Zonca's treatise on mechanical arts.

See also
 Artists in biographies by Giovanni Baglione
 Diagrams and explanations of the wonderful machines of the Far West

Notes

References
 Joseph Needham, Ling Wang, Gwei-Djen Lu Science and civilisation in China Cambridge University Press, 1965 
 Christopher Duffy Siege warfare: the fortress in the early modern world, 1494-1660 Routledge, 1979 

Engineers from Venice
Italian people of the Eighty Years' War